Constituencies in 1950–1955 | 1955 MPs | 1959 MPs | 1964 MPs | 1966 MPs | 1970 MPs | Constituencies in 1974–1983

This is a list of all constituencies that were in existence in the 1955, 1959, 1964, 1966, and 1970 General Elections.

1955-1974
Parliamentary constituencies
Parliamentary constituencies
Parliamentary constituencies